Current estimates indicates that over 24,000 new cases of cancer are recorded each year at Ghana.  In 2020, 15,802 Ghanaians died from cancer. A 2015 study in Kumasi recorded breast and cervical cancer raked high records among females. Prostrate cancer recorded the highest among males. Breast, liver and cervical were leading in both sexes.

History 
For many years, the mere mention of cancer was deemed a taboo in Ghana as it signals contamination or death. 

The first cancer registry in Ghana was established in Kumasi as the first population-based cancer registry in 2012 to provide information on cancer cases.

Treatment 
Ghana has a national cancer control plan. However, cancer rates are in a increasing trend due to unpreparedness. The country is faced with limited cancer care and lack of cancer education for care workers. Top quality care is only offered in the two main tertiary hospital that are in the two major cities of Ghana. Cancer care costs are expensive which proves tough for patients at the advanced stages of cancer. These coupled with no health insurance cover for cancer and the competition with alternative medicine. The country has made some advances in relation with care facilities and treatments. There are occurrences of misdiagnoses and inability for patients to afford medication.

Childhood cancer in Ghana 
Over a thousand childhood cancer cases are recorded in the country each year. These cases are often reported late making treatment difficult and expensive. In 2022, four childhood cancers were covered under the National Health Insurance Scheme (NHIS): acute lymphoblastic leukaemia, Burkitt lymphoma, retinoblastoma, and Wilms tumour. Only 30% of children with cancer seek healthcare due to financial difficulties. 

The country has two comprehensive Paediatric Oncology units at the Korle Bu and Komfo Anokye Teaching Hospitals. There are eight paediatric oncology fellows in training, three paediatric oncology pharmacists and 18 nurses in paediatric oncology. 

In 2022 the first Lady of Ghana commissioned a hostel for children cancer patients to alleviate transportation costs in seeking health care. 

The largest referral hospital in the country Korle bu has pledged to reduce childhood cancer by 2030 with a vision for every child patient to obtain equal access to treatment.

Cancer by type

Breast and cervical cancer 
Breast cancer is the most common cancer among females in Ghana. In 2020, there were 4400 cases of breast cancer and 2797 estimated cervical cancer cases. Over 3,000 women are diagnosed with cervical cancer each year and more than half of the figure die in Ghana. In 2018, it was estimated that over four thousand cases of breast cancer will be diagnosed and about 1800 women could die from cancer. 

Myths about breast cancer are one of the major reasons women fail to access treatment. Often, people report their cancer only when it is advanced, making it difficult to cure.

Rebecca Foundation, headed by the First Lady of Ghana, launched a project to reduce breast and cervical cancers in Ghana. It includes capacity building training for over 90 health professionals. The project started in West Gonja, Birim South, and Sekyere West.

Liver cancer 
Liver Cancer is the leading cause of cancer related deaths in the Volta Region of Ghana.

Prostrate cancer 
In 2020, Korlebu recorded over 1000 cases of prostate cancer. Most prostate cancer cases are often reported to the hospital at advanced stages due to reliance on herbal treatment.

See also
Healthcare in Ghana

References

Cancer
Health in Ghana